Ambrose W. Key (27 November 1829 – 17 August 1908) was an American pioneer. He was born in Crawfordsville, Indiana, the son of George Key and his wife Rebecca Mintun.  George, a native of Virginia, settled with his family in Ohio circa 1800.  From there, he began a career as a trader, traveling various rivers while establishing his trade routes.  In 1836, George spotted lands in Iowa which reminded him of his boyhood home in Virginia, staking a claim to what he dubbed "Virginia Grove" in Louisa County.  George planted crops there in 1836 and 1837, and wintered with his family back in Montgomery County, Indiana.  While raising his crops in 1838, George sent for his wife and family to come to Iowa.  Rebecca hired 10 men to help her move her family of 10 children, including Ambrose,  from Indiana to Iowa.  They averaged 7 miles per day on their 45-day trek, employing three wagons and a carriage, while driving a collection of young horses, cattle, and nearly 100 head of sheep.

Ambrose purchased  of government land in Louisa County during 1855, and was an established merchant in the town of Wapello by 1856.  On 21 May 1859, he married Mary Jones Garrett, a native of Ohio, in Tipton, Moniteau County, Missouri.  Within a year, the couple was residing in Washington County, Texas, where Ambrose was the proprietor of a general store.  Ambrose also purchased the Baker and Thomson Sawmill on the San Jacinto River, and operated a sash, door, and blind factory for about 4 years.  The family lived in Falls County, Texas for several years, where Ambrose bought another sawmill and started a tannery.

At the close of the Civil War, Ambrose and family spent a year in St. Louis, then relocated to Westport on the Kansas border. From 1872 until his death on 17 August 1908, Ambrose conducted a profitable business of raising fruits on his farm. He was survived by his wife and 4 children: sons Sidney D. and Joseph Francis Key, and daughters Nellie G. Key and Mrs. Gertrude Baldwin.

See also

Turner, Kansas

References
 THE WAPELLO TRIBUNE, Wapello, Iowa, Friday, 28 August 1908, Page 1; cites "The Republic" newspaper of Argentine, Kansas
 William G. Cutler's History of the State of Kansas - Wyandotte County, Part 19; Biographical Sketches, Shawnee Township
Census records
 1856 Iowa State Census - Wapello, Louisa County, Iowa, Page: 408 & 409
 1860 US Census - Washington PO, Washington County, Texas - NA Series M653,  Roll 1307, Page 177
 1870 US Census - Westport (4th Ward), Jackson County, Missouri - NA Series M593, Roll 781, Page 71
 1880 US Census - Shawnee, Wyandotte County, Kansas - NA Series T9, Roll 400, Page 327C
 1900 US Census - Shawnee, Wyandotte County, Kansas - NA Series T623, Roll 505, Page 176

External links

1829 births
1908 deaths
People from Crawfordsville, Indiana
American pioneers
People from Wyandotte County, Kansas
Deaths from stomach cancer
Deaths from cancer in Kansas
People from Wapello, Iowa
People from Washington County, Texas
People from Falls County, Texas